Ambil may refer to the following:

 Ambil, La Rioja, village in Argentina
 Ambil, Looc, island-barangay in the Philippines